Hinojosa may refer to:

 Hinojosa Site, Jim Wells County, Texas, archeological site (on National Register of Historic Places)

Persons
 Griselda Hinojosa (1875–1959), Chilean pharmacist
 José María Hinojosa Lasarte (1904-36), Spanish poet and Carlist/Agrarian political militant
 
 Juan Armando Hinojosa (fl. 2016), Mexican construction contractor and multiple-business operator

U.S. nationals
 Celina Hinojosa (born 1961), painter
 Christin Hinojosa (born 1975), actress, activist
 Gina Hinojosa (fl. 2007-16), Texas State Representative
 Maria Hinojosa (born 1969), journalist (with Mexico ties)
 Ricardo Hinojosa (born 1950), U.S. federal judge and Chairman of United States Sentencing Commission 
 Rubén Hinojosa (born 1940), U.S. House member (from Texas)
 Tish Hinojosa (born 1955), singer/songwriter

Places in Spain
 Hinojosa del Duque, province of Córdoba, Andalusia
 Hinojosa de Jarque, province of Teruel, Aragón
 Hinojosa del Valle, province of Badajoz, Extremadura

Castile-La Mancha
 La Hinojosa, province of Cuenca 
 Hinojosas de Calatrava, province of Ciudad Real
 Hinojosa de San Vicente, province of Toledo

Castile and León
 Hinojosa de Duero, province of Salamanca
 Hinojosa del Campo, province of Soria